Laurels origins are ambiguous. She first appeared in online British sources in 1802. She made three voyages from Liverpool to Africa. On the first she apparently was on a trading voyage. The second was a complete voyage as a slave ship in the triangular trade in enslaved people. During this voyage she was involved in two sanguinary engagements with French vessels, the second of which resulted in the death of her master. She set out on a second slave trading voyage in 1805 but a French squadron captured her before she had embarked any slaves.

Career
Laurel first appeared in Lloyd's Register (LR) and the Register of Shipping (RS) in 1802. Both agree on her burthen, master, and trade. They disagree on ownership and origins.

Lloyd's Register gave Laurels origins as Dutch, launched in 1786. The Register of Shipping described her as having been built in India, of teak, and having been launched in 1797. In later years it amended her listing to show her as a Dutch prize.

Captain Gould sailed to Africa. Lloyd's List reported in March 1803 that Laurel, Gould, master, had arrived in Africa from Liverpool. She returned to Liverpool from Africa on 10 August 1803. Her rapid and direct return suggests that this voyage was not one of slave trading. 

Captain Thomas Phillips acquired a letter of marque on 5 January 1804. They were out only three days when they encountered a French warship. They were able to escape though Laurel had one man killed and two wounded, and Urania had two men wounded. She acquired her slaves at Angola, as did Urania, and they then sailed in company for Demerara. 

Lloyd's List reported in January 1805 that Laurel, Phillips, master, and Urania, Melling, master, had encountered a French vessel while they were off Surinam. Phillips and his chief mate were killed and Urania had suffered so much damage it was feared that she would be condemned.

Laurel arrived at Demerara on 21 November 1804 with 206 slaves. Captain Phillips died on 30 November. Captain Henry Corren replaced Phillips. Laurel sailed from Demerara on 26 January 1805 and arrived back at Liverpool on 13 April. She had left Liverpool with 30 crew members and had suffered five crew deaths on her voyage.

Captain Robert Hume acquired a letter of marque on 8 October 1805. He sailed for Africa on 22 October.

Fate

The French put all the captured crews on Active and sent her back to England. The squadron burnt the other vessels that they had captured. The captains arrived at Waterford on 12 May.

Notes

Citations

References
 

1802 ships
Age of Sail merchant ships of England
Liverpool slave ships
Captured ships